The Pike is a precision-guided mini-missile designed by Raytheon. It is a 40 mm guided munition that can be fired from the barrel of a Heckler & Koch M320 Grenade Launcher Module and Enhanced Grenade Launching Module (EGLM) like a standard 40mm grenade, but is powered by a rocket motor to propel it  to give infantrymen improved extended-range precision capabilities. The weapon uses a digital, semi-active laser seeker to guide itself to within five meters of the target; it can operate in a two-man shooter/spotter team or by the grenadier alone lazing after firing, as it can fly for 15 seconds before homing in. When fired, Pike has a small propellant to "kick" it  out of the tube before the nearly smokeless motor ignites, and range is dependent on firing angle. The munition is effective against fixed and slow-moving mid-range targets, using a  blast fragmentation warhead with a 10-meter lethality radius. Raytheon developed the weapon for three years in collaboration with Nammo Talley, which developed the warhead and propulsion system. The Pike is intended to be more accurate with a longer range than rocket propelled grenades (RPGs) and standard rifle grenades, while being far lighter and more cost-effective than current infantry guided weapons like the $78,000 each FGM-148 Javelin. Further improvements could include different fuses, multiple-round simultaneous programming and targeting with data-link capabilities, and platform integration onto small boats, vehicles, and small unmanned aerial vehicles (UAVs). At AUSA 2015, Raytheon revealed they had performed two successful test firings of the Pike.

After its unveiling, Raytheon received permission to market the Pike to foreign governments, several of which have shown interest for infantry forces and special operators.  While it is more expensive than unguided RPGs and less powerful than a Javelin, it is cheaper than anti-tank missiles and powerful enough to blast through walls and other barriers. While the M203 would have to be modified to swing out far enough to accept the round, the Pike can be fired from other launchers such as the break-open, M79 and large breech M320. The Pike is already in service with Canadian special forces, using an underslung H&K M320 40mm grenade launcher—rifles equipped this way use laser designators on the rifle, but standalone designators are also used.

User
: Canadian special forces

See also
AeroVironment Switchblade
Guided Multipurpose Munition

References

External links
Raytheon

Explosive weapons
Surface-to-surface missiles of the United States
Raytheon Company products